Hannah Dreier is an American journalist. She is a New York Times reporter who specializes in narrative features and investigations. She previously worked at ProPublica, where she was the recipient of the 2019 Pulitzer Prize for Feature Writing, and The Washington Post, where she was a finalist for the 2022 Pulitzer Prize for Investigative Reporting. She was Venezuela correspondent for The Associated Press during the first four years of the administration of President Nicolas Maduro.

Education and career

Hannah Dreier grew up in San Francisco. After completing high school at The Urban School of San Francisco, she graduated from Wesleyan University in Connecticut, and spent the first years of her career at The Mercury News.

Dreier joined Associated Press as a politics reporter in the Sacramento bureau and later covered the business of gambling from Las Vegas. She was the Venezuela correspondent for Associated Press for three years, moving to Caracas in 2014 amid a nationwide protest movement, and has told the story of the country's unraveling from inside prisons, hospitals and factories. Her 2016 "Venezuela Undone" series illustrated Venezuela’s social and economic collapse through deeply reported accounts of ordinary citizens struggling to survive and was recognized by the Best American Newspaper Narrative Writing Contest, the Michael Kelly Award, the Gerald Loeb Award for International business journalism, and the American Society of Newspaper Editors.

Following the narcosobrinos affair which saw president Nicolás Maduro's nephews arrested in the United States for drug trafficking, Dreier was detained by SEBIN (Bolivarian Intelligence Service) agents in Sabaneta, Barinas. Agents threatened her during an interrogation, saying they would behead her like ISIL did to James Foley and said that they would let her go for a kiss. Finally, agents said that they wanted to coerce the United States to exchange Maduro's nephews for Dreier, accusing her of being a spy and sabotaging the Venezuelan economy.

A piece in the Columbia Journalism Review highlighted Dreier's work translating the Venezuela crisis for foreign readers. "Dreier has helped the rest of us understand how, why and what, exactly, is taking place in the country. She’s also gained a huge following on social media, where readers catch a glimpse into everyday life there—the quirky, surprising and alarming—sometimes from the window of her apartment," it said.

In 2017, Dreier joined ProPublica as a reporter covering immigration. There, she wrote a series of investigative magazine features about the gang MS-13.
 
At The Washington Post, Dreier reported on immigration, policing and federal disaster aid. Her reporting on inequities in disaster aid programs led to "major process changes at FEMA to directly address these issues."

Awards

Her stories have been recognized by the Overseas Press Club, the Society of Professional Journalists, the Robert F. Kennedy Journalism Awards, the National Magazine Awards, the Peabody Awards, Investigative Reporters and Editors and the Goldsmith Prize for Investigative Reporting. In 2017 she was the recipient of the James Foley Medill Medal for Courage in Journalism for her coverage of the recurring turmoil in Venezuela.

In 2019, Dreier won the Pulitzer Prize for Feature Writing.

In 2021, she won the Livingston Award for stories showing how the Trump administration was weaponizing confidential disclosures that young asylum-seekers made in therapy sessions. In 2013, she was a finalist for the Livingston Award for revealing that the state of California had been raiding a fund meant for children who lost parents in the 9/11 attacks. In 2017, she was a finalist for the Livingston Award for “Venezuela Undone,” which documented that country’s humanitarian collapse. In 2017, she was a finalist for the Livingston Award for “Trapped in Gangland,” which tracked a botched police crackdown on the gang MS-13.

Books
Dreier's work has been republished in collections including The Best American Magazine Writing and Best American Newspaper Narratives.

References

External links
 Personal website
 Venezuelan Undone, A Year Chaos in Tweet Associated Press Interactives
 Politico interview, "What’s It Like to See a Democracy Destroyed?"
 Nieman Storyboard Annotation, "Navigating ethics, culture and safety to immerse in immigration and Covid"
 Nieman Storyboard Annotation, "Extraordinary access: A reporter follows a police officer on a mental health call"

American women journalists
Associated Press reporters
Living people
Wesleyan University alumni
The Mercury News people
Gerald Loeb Award winners International
Year of birth missing (living people)
Pulitzer Prize for Feature Writing winners
Journalists from California
Writers from San Francisco
21st-century American journalists
21st-century American women writers
The Washington Post journalists